Lars Ivar Andersson (born 22 November 1948) is a Swedish sprint canoeist who competed from the late 1960s to the late 1970s. He won five medals at the ICF Canoe Sprint World Championships with two golds (K-2 500 m: 1970, 1971) and three silvers (K-1 1000 m: 1970, 1971; K-2 1000 m: 1970).

Andersson also competed in three Summer Olympics, earning his best finish of fifth in the K-2 1000 m event at Mexico City in 1968.

References

1948 births
Canoeists at the 1968 Summer Olympics
Canoeists at the 1972 Summer Olympics
Canoeists at the 1976 Summer Olympics
Living people
Olympic canoeists of Sweden
Swedish male canoeists
ICF Canoe Sprint World Championships medalists in kayak